The Mini-DVI connector is used on certain Apple computers as a digital alternative to the Mini-VGA connector. Its size is between the full-sized DVI and the tiny Micro-DVI. It is found on the 12-inch PowerBook G4 (except the original 12-inch 867 MHz PowerBook G4, which used Mini-VGA), the Intel-based iMac, the MacBook Intel-based laptop, the Intel-based Xserve, the 2009 Mac mini, and some late model eMacs.

In October 2008, Apple announced the company was phasing Mini-DVI out in favor of Mini DisplayPort.

Mini-DVI connectors on Apple hardware are capable of carrying DVI, VGA, or TV signals through the use of adapters, detected with EDID (Extended display identification data) via DDC. This connector is often used in place of a DVI connector in order to save physical space on devices. Mini-DVI does not support dual-link connections and hence cannot support resolutions higher than 1920×1200 @60 Hz.

There are various types of Mini-DVI adapter:
Apple Mini-DVI to VGA Adapter Apple part number M9320G/A (discontinued)
Apple Mini-DVI to Video Adapter Apple part number M9319G/A, provided both S-Video and Composite video connectors (discontinued)
Apple Mini-DVI to DVI Adapter (DVI-D) Apple part number M9321G/B (discontinued)
Non-OEM Mini-DVI to HDMI adapters are also available at online stores such as eBay and Amazon, and from some retail stores, but were not sold by Apple.

The physical connector is similar to Mini-VGA, but is differentiated by having four rows of pins arranged in two vertically stacked slots rather than the two rows of pins in the Mini-VGA.

Connecting to a DVI-I connector requires a Mini-DVI to DVI-D cable plus a DVI-D to DVI-I adapter.

Criticisms
Apple's Mini-DVI to DVI-D cable does not carry the analog signal coming from the mini-DVI port on the Apple computer. This means that it is not possible to use this cable with an inexpensive DVI-to-VGA adapter for VGA output; Apple's mini-DVI to VGA cable must be used instead. This could be avoided if Apple provided a mini-DVI to DVI-I cable. The purpose of DVI-I is to ensure universal compatibility.
The Apple mini-DVI to DVI-D cable's package shows a DVI-I figure instead of DVI-D and does not specify that it comes with only DVI-D.

Compatibility
As Mini-DVI is pin-compatible with DVI, it supports both DVI and VGA through adapters.

See also
DVI
Micro-DVI
Mini DisplayPort

References

External links
12-inch PowerBook G4 Developer Note: External Display Port

Digital display connectors
Graphics cards
Apple Inc. hardware